The 16th Armored Division of Qazvin is an armored division of the Islamic Republic of Iran Army, first formed during the reign of the Shah.

References 

Armored divisions of Ground Forces of Islamic Republic of Iran Army
Qazvin